The 6th constituency of Val-d'Oise is a French legislative constituency in the Val-d'Oise département.
It is currently represented by Nathalie Élimas of the Democratic Movement.

Description

The 6th constituency of Val-d'Oise is one of a group of constituencies in the south the department which form part of the north western suburbs of the Paris Metropolitan Area.

Historically the constituency has elected conservatives but Christine Neracoulis of the PS came within 400 votes of capturing the seat at the 2012 elections.

Historic representation

Election results

2022

 
 
 
 
 
 
 
 
 
 
 

 
 
 
 
 

* MoDem dissident

2017

2012

 
 
 
 
 
 
 
|-
| colspan="8" bgcolor="#E9E9E9"|
|-

2007

 
 
 
 
 
 
 
|-
| colspan="8" bgcolor="#E9E9E9"|
|-

2002

 
 
 
 
 
 
|-
| colspan="8" bgcolor="#E9E9E9"|
|-

1997

 
 
 
 
 
 
 
 
|-
| colspan="8" bgcolor="#E9E9E9"|
|-

Sources
Official results of French elections from 2002: "Résultats électoraux officiels en France" (in French).

6